The 1915 Washington Senators won 85 games, lost 68, and finished in fourth place in the American League. They were managed by Clark Griffith and played home games at National Park.

Regular season

Season standings

Record vs. opponents

Notable transactions 
 July 29, 1915: Merlin Kopp was purchased by the Senators from the St. Thomas Saints.

Roster

Player stats

Batting

Starters by position 
Note: Pos = Position; G = Games played; AB = At bats; H = Hits; Avg. = Batting average; HR = Home runs; RBI = Runs batted in

Other batters 
Note: G = Games played; AB = At bats; H = Hits; Avg. = Batting average; HR = Home runs; RBI = Runs batted in

Pitching

Starting pitchers 
Note: G = Games pitched; IP = Innings pitched; W = Wins; L = Losses; ERA = Earned run average; SO = Strikeouts

Other pitchers 
Note: G = Games pitched; IP = Innings pitched; W = Wins; L = Losses; ERA = Earned run average; SO = Strikeouts

Relief pitchers 
Note: G = Games pitched; W = Wins; L = Losses; SV = Saves; ERA = Earned run average; SO = Strikeouts

Notes

References 
1915 Washington Senators at Baseball-Reference
1915 Washington Senators team page at www.baseball-almanac.com

Minnesota Twins seasons
Washington Senators season
1915 in sports in Washington, D.C.